Irena Tichá (born 16 February 1943) is a Czech volleyball player. She competed in the women's tournament at the 1968 Summer Olympics.

References

External links
 

1943 births
Living people
Czech women's volleyball players
Olympic volleyball players of Czechoslovakia
Volleyball players at the 1968 Summer Olympics
People from Jičín District
Sportspeople from the Hradec Králové Region